The 39th Ohio Infantry Regiment was an infantry regiment in the Union Army during the American Civil War.

Service
The 39th Ohio Infantry Regiment was organized at Camp Colerain and Camp Dennison near Cincinnati, Ohio July 31 through August 13, 1861, and mustered in for three years service under the command of Colonel John Groesbeck.

The regiment was attached to Army of the West and Department of the Missouri to February 1862. 1st Brigade, 1st Division, Army of the Mississippi, to April 1862. 1st Brigade, 2nd Division, Army of the Mississippi, to November 1862. 1st Brigade, 8th Division, Left Wing, XIII Corps, Department of the Tennessee, to December 1862. 1st Brigade, 8th Division, XVI Corps, to March 1863. 4th Brigade, District of Corinth, Mississippi, 2nd Division, XVI Corps, to May 1863. 3rd Brigade, District of Memphis, Tennessee, 5th Division, XVI Corps, to November 1863. Fuller's Brigade, 2nd Division, XVI Corps, to January 1864. 1st Brigade, 4th Division, XVI Corps, to September 1864. 1st Brigade, 1st Division, XVII Corps, to July 1865.

The 39th Ohio Infantry mustered out of service at Louisville, Kentucky, on July 9, 1865.

Detailed service
Left Ohio for St. Louis, Mo., August 18, then moved to Medon September 6 (9 companies). (Company K served detached at St. Louis, Mo., September 1861 to February 1862.) Companies A, B, E, and I on duty at St. Joseph, Mo., guarding Northern Missouri Railroad September 1861 to February 1862. Companies C, D, F, G, and H marched to relief of Lexington, Mo., September 12–20; then to Kansas City September 21–22. Fremont's advance on Springfield, Mo., October 15-November 2, 1861. March to Sedalia November 9–17. Duty at Sedalia and Syracuse, Mo., until February 1862. Action at Shanghai December 1, 1861. Moved to St. Louis, Mo., February 2, 1862, then to Commerce, Mo., February 22–24. Siege operations against New Madrid, Mo., March 3–14. Siege and capture of Island No. 10, Mississippi River, and pursuit to Tiptonville March 15-April 8. Expedition to Fort Pillow, Tenn., April 13–17. Moved to Hamburg Landing, Tenn., April 18–22. Action at Monterey April 29. Advance on and siege of Corinth, Miss., April 29-May 30. Reconnaissance toward Corinth May 8. Near Corinth May 24. Occupation of Corinth and pursuit to Booneville May 30-June 12. Duty at Clear Creek until August 29. Battle of Iuka, Miss., September 19. Battle of Corinth, Miss., October 3–4. Pursuit to Ripley October 5–12. Grant's Central Mississippi Campaign November 2, 1862, to January 12, 1863. Expedition to Jackson December 18. Action at Parker's Cross Roads December 30. Red Mound or Parker's Cross Roads December 31. Duty at Corinth until April 1863. Dodge's Expedition to northern Alabama April 15-May 8. Rock Cut, near Tuscumbia, April 22. Tuscumbia April 23. Town Creek April 28. Duty at Memphis, Tenn., until October, and at Prospect, Tenn., until February 1864. Reenlisted at Prospect December 26, 1863. Atlanta Campaign May 1 to September 8, 1864. Demonstrations on Resaca May 8–13. Sugar Valley, near Resaca, May 9. Near Resaca May 13. Battle of Resaca May 14–15. Advance on Dallas May 18–25. Operations on line of Pumpkin Vine Creek and battles about Dallas, New Hope Church and Allatoona Hills May 25-June 5. Operations about Marietta and against Kennesaw Mountain June 10-July 2. Assault on Kennesaw June 27. Nickajack Creek July 2–5. Ruff's Mills July 3–4. Chattahoochie River July 5–17. Battle of Atlanta July 22. Siege of Atlanta July 22-August 25. Flank movement on Jonesboro August 25–30. Battle of Jonesboro August 31-September 1. Lovejoy's Station September 2–6. Operations against Hood in northern Georgia and northern Alabama September 29-November 3. March to the sea November 15-December 10. Monteith Swamp December 9. Siege of Savannah December 10–21. Campaign of the Carolinas January to April 1865. Reconnaissance to the Salkehatchie River, S.C., January 20. Skirmishes at Rivers and Broxton Bridges, Salkehatchie River, February 2. Action at Rivers Bridge, Salkehatchie River, February 3. Binnaker's Bridge, South Edisto River, February 9. Orangeburg, North Edisto River, February 12–13. Columbia February 16–17. Juniper Creek, near Cheraw, March 3. Battle of Bentonville, N.C., March 20–21. Occupation of Goldsboro and Raleigh, Bennett's House, April 26. Surrender of Johnston and his army. March to Washington, D.C., via Richmond, Va., April 29-May 20. Grand Review of the Armies May 24. Moved to Louisville, Ky., June.

Casualties
The regiment lost a total of 196 men during service; 2 officers and 62 enlisted men killed or mortally wounded, 3 officers and 129 enlisted men died of disease.

Commanders
 Colonel John Groesbeck - discharged July 8, 1862
 Colonel Alfred West Gilbert - resigned October 1, 1862
 Colonel Edward Follansbee Noyes - commanded at the Battle of Island No. 10 as major; brevet brigadier general, March 13, 1865; resigned April 22, 1865
 Colonel Daniel Weber - promoted to colonel May 18, 1865; mustered out with regiment July 9, 1865

See also

 List of Ohio Civil War units
 Ohio in the Civil War

References
 Bruner, Frank. Roster: Surviving Members of the 39th Ohio Veteran Volunteer Infantry (Cincinnati, OH:  S. Rosenthal & Co.), 1893.
 Chidlaw, Benjamin Williams. A Thanksgiving Sermon Preached Before the Thirty-ninth O.V., U.S.A., at Camp Todd, Macon, Missouri, Nov. 28, 1861, and a Sketch of the Regiment (Cincinnati, OH:  G. Crosby), 1861. [author served as regimental chaplain]
 Chidlaw, Henrietta. "Sunset and Evening Star": In Memoriam of Benjamin Williams Chidlaw (Utica, NY:  Press of T. J. Griffeths), 1894.
 Dyer, Frederick H. A Compendium of the War of the Rebellion (Des Moines, IA:  Dyer Pub. Co.), 1908.
 Gilbert, Alfred. Colonel A. W. Gilbert: Citizen-Soldier of Cincinnati (Cincinnati, OH:  Historical and Philosophical Society of Ohio), 1934. 
 Ohio Roster Commission. Official Roster of the Soldiers of the State of Ohio in the War on the Rebellion, 1861–1865, Compiled Under the Direction of the Roster Commission (Akron, OH: Werner Co.), 1886–1895.
 Reid, Whitelaw. Ohio in the War: Her Statesmen, Her Generals, and Soldiers (Cincinnati, OH: Moore, Wilstach, & Baldwin), 1868. 
 Sheppard, Oscar. Fuller's Ohio brigade, 27th, 39th, 43d, and 63d Regiments, Ohio Volunteer Infantry: List of Survivors, with Post-Office Addresses (Dayton, OH:  Press of the United Brethren Pub. House), 1891.
 Smith, Charles H. The History of Fuller's Ohio Brigade, 1861-1865: Its Great March, with Roster, Portraits, Battle Maps and Biographies (Cleveland, OH:  Press of A. J. Watt), 1909.
Attribution

External links
 Ohio in the Civil War: 39th Ohio Volunteer Infantry by Larry Stevens
 Brief history, statistics, and reports

Military units and formations established in 1861
Military units and formations disestablished in 1865
Units and formations of the Union Army from Ohio
1861 establishments in Ohio